WTG, or Web Technology Group, is a technology consultancy and solutions provider.

WTG may also refer to:

 World Transplant Games, an international multi-sport event organized by the World Transplant Games Federation
 WTG Records, an American record label
 WTG Morton (1819–1868), American dentist and physician